Dion Bentley (born August 26, 1971) is an American long jumper.

Bentley attended Penn Hills High School, where he had a stellar track career, including setting the still current American Junior record in the long jump.  He was Track and Field News "High School Athlete of the Year" in 1989.

He went to the University of Florida, where he continued to compete in the long jump and holds the Gators' indoor and outdoor records.  Bentley had the unfortunate timing of reaching the elite ranks at the peak of the careers of Carl Lewis, Mike Powell, Larry Myricks and Joe Greene among others, reaching as high as #6 on the U.S. rankings in 1994 in his three visits to the top ten.  As of 2013, he ranks as #50 on the all-time world performer list.

References

External links
IAAF profile for Dion Bentley

1971 births
Living people
People from Penn Hills Township, Allegheny County, Pennsylvania
American male long jumpers
Sportspeople from the Pittsburgh metropolitan area
Florida Gators men's track and field athletes
Athletes (track and field) at the 1995 Pan American Games
Pan American Games track and field athletes for the United States